iMacros is a browser based application for macro recording, editing and playback for web automation and testing. It is provided as a standalone application and extensions for the Mozilla Firefox, Google Chrome, and Internet Explorer web browsers. Developed by iOpus/Ipswitch, It adds record and replay functionality similar to that found in web testing and form filler software. The macros can be combined and controlled via JavaScript. Demo macros and JavaScript code examples are included with the software. Running strictly JavaScript based macros were removed in later versions of iMacros browser extensions. However, users can use alternative browser like Pale Moon, based on older version of Mozilla Firefox to use JavaScript files for web based automated testing with Moon Tester Tool.

History
First created in 2001 by Mathias Roth, iMacros was the first macro recorder tool specifically designed and optimized for web browsers and form filling. In April 2012 iMacros was acquired by Ipswitch. In 2019 Ipswitch itself (and thus iMacros along with it) was acquired by Progress. In November 2022 Progress discontinued iMacros.

Features
iMacros for Firefox and Chrome offers a feature known as social scripting, which allows users to share macros and scripts in a manner similar to social bookmarking. Technically, these functions are distributed on web sites by embedding the imacro and the controlling JavaScript inside a plain text link.

Along with the freeware version, iMacros is available as a proprietary commercial application, with additional features and support for web scripting, web scraping, internet server monitoring, and web testing. In addition to working with HTML pages, the commercial editions can automate Adobe Flash, Adobe Flex, Silverlight, and Java applets by using Directscreen and image recognition technology. The freeware version of iMacros contains no control flow statements and, with a few minor exceptions, complex or conditional code requires scripting available only in the commercial version.

Advanced versions also contain a command-line interface and an application programming interface (API) to automate more complicated tasks and integrate with other programs or scripts. The iMacros API is called the Scripting Interface. The Scripting Interface of the iMacros Scripting Edition is designed as a Component Object Model (COM) object and allows the user to remotely control (script) the iMacros Browser, Internet Explorer, Firefox and Chrome from any Windows programming or scripting language.

See also
Jaxer
Greasemonkey
Selenium
List of augmented browsing software
List of Firefox extensions

References

External links
 

Automation software
Internet Explorer add-ons
Nonfree Firefox WebExtensions
Scripting languages
Google Chrome extensions
Web scraping